Bridge Cottage is a 16th-century thatched cottage in Flatford, East Bergholt, Suffolk, England. It has been  a National Trust property since 1943 and a Grade II* listed building since 1955. The National Trust market the property under the name "Flatford: Bridge Cottage". The building is timber framed, but this is not evident from the outside as it is rendered.

The property is located in the heart of Dedham Vale, a typical Suffolk rural landscape. It is noted as the location for works by John Constable, and presents an exhibition of his paintings.

The cottage is located just upstream from Flatford Mill which, along with neighbouring Valley Farm and Willy Lott's Cottage, are leased to the Field Studies Council; a group uses them as locations for arts-based courses.

The property provides access to a number of walks along the River Stour.

References

External links

 Flatford - National Trust

Grade II* listed buildings in Suffolk
Houses in Suffolk
National Trust properties in Suffolk
East Bergholt
Historic house museums in Suffolk
Art museums and galleries in Suffolk
John Constable
Thatched buildings in Suffolk
Timber framed buildings in Suffolk